The Chicago Bulls are an American professional basketball team based in Chicago. The Bulls compete in the National Basketball Association (NBA) as a member of the league's Eastern Conference Central Division. The team was founded on January 16, 1966, and played its first game during the 1966–67 NBA season. The Bulls play their home games at the United Center, an arena on Chicago's West Side.

The Bulls saw their greatest success during the 1990s when they played a major part in popularizing the NBA worldwide. They are known for having one of the NBA's greatest dynasties, winning six NBA championships between 1991 and 1998 with two three-peats. All six of their championship teams were led by Hall of Famers Michael Jordan, Scottie Pippen, and coach Phil Jackson. The Bulls are the only NBA franchise to win multiple championships while never losing an NBA Finals series in their history.

The Bulls won 72 games during the 1995–96 season, setting an NBA record that stood until the Golden State Warriors won 73 games during the 2015–16 season. The Bulls were the first team in NBA history to win 70 games or more in a single season, and the only NBA franchise to do so until the 2015–16 Warriors.

Since 1998, the Bulls have failed to regain their former success. The franchise struggled throughout the 2000s, but showed promise in the early 2010s led by Derrick Rose and Joakim Noah, culminating in back-to-back seasons above .732 in 2010–11 and 2011–12. The injury to Rose and subsequent trades of key players triggered a rebuild, culminating in the current lineup built around all-stars Zach LaVine, DeMar DeRozan and Nikola Vucevic. 

Jordan and Rose have won the NBA Most Valuable Player Award while playing for the Bulls, for a total of six MVP awards. The Bulls share rivalries with the Cleveland Cavaliers, Detroit Pistons, Miami Heat, and the New York Knicks. The Bulls' rivalry with the Pistons was highlighted heavily during the late 1980s and early 1990s. Outside of basketball, the Chicago Bulls are also known for their community work through their charity department which provides youth and not-for-profit organizations with tickets to games and merchandise.

Franchise history

1966–1975: Team creation and early success
On January 16, 1966, Chicago was granted an NBA franchise to be called the Bulls. The Chicago Bulls became the third NBA franchise in the city, after the Chicago Stags (1946–1950) and the Chicago Packers/Zephyrs (1961–1963, now the Washington Wizards). The Bulls' founder, Dick Klein, was the Bulls' only owner to ever play professional basketball (for the Chicago American Gears). He served as the Bulls' general manager and president in their initial years. 

After the 1966 NBA Expansion Draft, the newly founded Chicago Bulls were allowed to acquire players from the previously established teams in the league for the upcoming 1966–67 season. The team started during the 1966–67 season, and posted a 33–48 record, the best by an expansion team in NBA history. Coached by Chicagoan and former NBA star Johnny "Red" Kerr, and led by former NBA assist leader Guy Rodgers, guard Jerry Sloan and forward Bob Boozer, the Bulls qualified for the playoffs, the only NBA team to do so in their inaugural season.

In their first season, the Bulls played their home games at the International Amphitheatre, before moving to Chicago Stadium.

Fan interest was diminishing after four seasons, with one game in the 1967–68 season having an official attendance of 891 and some games being played in Kansas City. In 1969, Klein dropped out of the general manager job and hired Pat Williams, who as the Philadelphia 76ers' business manager created promotions that helped the team become third in attendance the previous season. Williams revamped the team roster, acquiring Chet Walker from Philadelphia in exchange for Jim Washington and drafting Norm Van Lier – who was traded to the Cincinnati Royals and only joined the Bulls in 1971 – while also investing in promotion, with actions such as creating mascot Benny the Bull. The Bulls under Williams and head coach Dick Motta qualified for four straight playoffs and had attendances grow to over 10,000. In 1972, the Bulls set a franchise win–loss record at 57 wins and 25 losses. During the 1970s, the Bulls relied on Jerry Sloan, forwards Bob Love and Chet Walker, point guard Norm Van Lier, and centers Clifford Ray and Tom Boerwinkle. The team made the conference finals in 1975 but lost to the eventual champions, the Golden State Warriors, 4 games to 3.

After four 50-win seasons, Williams returned to Philadelphia, and Motta decided to take on the role of GM as well. The Bulls ended up declining, winning only 24 games in the 1975–76 season. Motta was fired and replaced by Ed Badger.

1976–1984: Gilmore and Theus duo

Klein sold the Bulls to the Wirtz family, longtime owners of the Chicago Blackhawks. Indifferent to NBA basketball, the new ownership group infamously implemented a shoestring budget, putting little time and investment into improving the team.

Artis Gilmore, acquired in the ABA dispersal draft in 1976, led a Bulls squad which included guard Reggie Theus, forward David Greenwood and forward Orlando Woolridge.

In 1979, the Bulls lost a coin flip for the right to select first in the NBA draft (Rod Thorn, the Bulls' general manager, called "heads"). Had the Bulls won the toss, they would have selected Magic Johnson; instead, they selected David Greenwood with the second pick. The Los Angeles Lakers selected Johnson with the pick acquired from the New Orleans Jazz, who traded the selection for Gail Goodrich.

After Gilmore was traded to the San Antonio Spurs for center Dave Corzine, the Bulls employed a high-powered offense centered on Theus, and which soon included guards Quintin Dailey and Ennis Whatley. However, with continued dismal results, the Bulls decided to change direction, trading Theus to the Kansas City Kings during the 1983–84 season. Attendance began to dwindle, with the Wirtz family looking to sell to ownership groups interested in moving the team out of Chicago, before selling to local ownership.

1984–1993: Michael Jordan era begins

In the summer of 1984, the Bulls had the third pick of the 1984 NBA draft, after Houston and Portland. The Rockets selected Hakeem Olajuwon, the Blazers picked Sam Bowie and the Bulls chose shooting guard Michael Jordan. The team, with new management in owner Jerry Reinsdorf and general manager Jerry Krause, decided to rebuild around Jordan. Jordan set franchise records during his rookie campaign for scoring (third in the league) and steals (fourth), and led the Bulls back to the playoffs, where they lost in four games to the Milwaukee Bucks. For his efforts, he was rewarded with a selection to the All-NBA Second Team and the NBA Rookie of the Year Award.

In the following off-season, the team acquired point guard John Paxson and on draft day traded with the Cavaliers for the rights to power forward Charles Oakley. Along with Jordan and center Dave Corzine, they provided much of the Bulls' offense for the next two years. After suffering a broken foot early in the 1985–86 season, Jordan finished second on the team to Woolridge in scoring. Jordan returned for the playoffs, and led the eighth-place Bulls against the 67–15 Boston Celtics, led by Larry Bird. At the time, the Bulls had the fifth-worst record of any team to qualify for the playoffs in NBA history. Though the Bulls were swept, Jordan recorded a playoff single-game record 63 points in Game 2 (which still stands to this day), prompting Bird to call him 'God disguised as Michael Jordan.'

In the 1986–87 season, Jordan continued his assault on the record books, leading the league in scoring with 37.1 points per game and becoming the first Bull named to the All-NBA First Team. The Bulls finished 40–42, which was good enough to qualify them for the playoffs. However, they were again swept by the Celtics in the playoffs.

In the 1987 draft, to address their lack of depth, Krause selected center Olden Polynice eighth overall and power forward Horace Grant 10th overall, then sent Polynice to Seattle in a draft-day trade for the fifth selection, small forward Scottie Pippen. With Paxson and Jordan in the backcourt, Brad Sellers and Oakley at the forward spots, Corzine anchoring center, and rookies Pippen and Grant coming off the bench, the Bulls won 50 games and advanced to the Eastern Conference semifinals, where they were beaten by the eventual Eastern Conference Champions Detroit Pistons in five games. For his efforts, Jordan was named NBA Most Valuable Player, an award he would win four more times over his career. The 1987–88 season would also mark the start of the Pistons-Bulls rivalry which was formed from 1988 to 1991.

The 1988–89 season marked a second straight year of major off-season moves. Power forward Charles Oakley, who had led the league in total rebounds in both 1987 and 1988, was traded on the eve of the 1988 NBA draft to the New York Knicks along with a first-round draft pick used by the Knicks to select Rod Strickland for center Bill Cartwright and a first-round pick, which the Bulls used to obtain center Will Perdue. In addition, the Bulls acquired three-point shooter Craig Hodges from Phoenix. The new starting lineup of Paxson, Jordan, Pippen, Grant, and Cartwright took some time to mesh, winning fewer games than the previous season, but made it all the way to the Eastern Conference Finals, where they were defeated in six games by the NBA champion Pistons.

In 1989–90, Jordan led the league in scoring for the fourth straight season and was joined on the all-star squad for the first time by Pippen. There was also a major change during the off-season, where head coach Doug Collins was replaced by assistant coach Phil Jackson. The Bulls also picked up rookie center Stacey King and rookie point guard B. J. Armstrong in the 1989 draft. With these additional players and the previous year's starting five, the Bulls again made it to the Conference Finals and pushed the Pistons to seven games before being eliminated for the third straight year, the Pistons going on to repeat as NBA champions.

1990–1993: First championship three-peat

In the 1990–91 season, the Bulls recorded a then-franchise record 61 wins, and romped through the playoffs, where they swept the Knicks in the first round, defeated the Philadelphia 76ers in the semifinals, and then swept the defending champion Pistons in the Conference Finals, then winning the NBA Finals in five games over the Magic Johnson-led Los Angeles Lakers.

The Bulls won their second straight title in  after racking up another franchise record for wins with 67. They swept the Miami Heat in the first round, defeated the Knicks in seven games in the second round, then the Cleveland Cavaliers in six games in the third round, advancing to the Finals for the second year in a row where they defeated the Clyde Drexler-led Portland Trail Blazers in six games.

In , the Bulls won their third consecutive championship by defeating the Atlanta Hawks, Cleveland Cavaliers and New York Knicks in the first three rounds of the playoffs and then defeating regular-season MVP Charles Barkley and the Phoenix Suns in the Finals, with Paxson's three-pointer with 3.9 seconds left giving them a 99–98 victory in Game 6 in Phoenix.

1993–1995: Jordan's first retirement

On October 6, 1993, Michael Jordan shocked the basketball community by announcing his retirement, three months after his father's murder. The Bulls were then led by Scottie Pippen, who established himself as one of the top players in the league by winning the 1994 All-Star MVP. He received help from Horace Grant and B. J. Armstrong, who were named to their first all-star games. The three were assisted by Cartwright, Perdue, shooting guard Pete Myers, and Croatian rookie forward Toni Kukoč. Despite the Bulls winning 55 games during the 1993–94 season, they were beaten in seven games by the Knicks in the second round of the playoffs, after a controversial foul call by referee Hue Hollins in game 5 of that series. The Knicks eventually reached the NBA Finals that year, but lost to the Houston Rockets. The Bulls opened the 1994–95 season by leaving their home of 27 years, Chicago Stadium, and moving into their current home, the United Center.

In 1994, the Bulls lost Grant, Cartwright and Scott Williams to free agency, and John Paxson to retirement, but picked up shooting guard Ron Harper, the seeming heir apparent to Jordan in assistant coach Tex Winter's triple-post offense, and small-forward Jud Buechler. The Bulls started Armstrong and Harper in the backcourt, Pippen and Kukoč at the forward spots, and Perdue at center. They also had sharpshooter Steve Kerr, whom they acquired via free agency before the 1993–94 season, Myers, and centers Luc Longley (acquired via trade in 1994 from the Minnesota Timberwolves) and Bill Wennington. However, the Bulls struggled during the season, and on March 18, 1995, they received the news that Michael Jordan was coming out of retirement. He scored 55 points against the Knicks in only his fifth game back, and led the Bulls to the fifth seed in the playoffs, where they defeated the Charlotte Hornets. However, Jordan and the Bulls were unable to overcome the eventual Eastern Conference champion Orlando Magic, which included Horace Grant, Penny Hardaway, and Shaquille O'Neal.

In the off-season, the Bulls lost Armstrong in the expansion draft, and Krause traded Perdue to the San Antonio Spurs for rebounding specialist Dennis Rodman, who had won the past four rebounding titles, and who had also been a member of the Detroit Pistons' "Bad Boys" squad that served as the Bulls' chief nemesis in the late 1980s.

1995–1998: Return of Michael Jordan and second championship three-peat

With a lineup of Jordan, Pippen, Rodman, Harper and Longley, and perhaps the league's best bench in Steve Kerr, Kukoč, Wennington, Buechler, and guard Randy Brown, the Bulls were seen as the team to win again for the NBA Finals.

The Bulls started their 1995–96 campaign with a 105–91 win over the visiting Hornets. In that game, Michael Jordan recorded 42 points, 6 rebounds and 7 assists for the Bulls. The next game, they were up against the Boston Celtics. The Bulls scored 35 points in the 3rd quarter as they pull away against the Celtics, 107–85. Six Bulls players scored in double figures in this win. The 1995–96 Bulls posted one of the best single-season improvements in league history and the best single-season record at that time, moving from 47–35 to 72–10, becoming the first NBA team to win 70 or more games. Jordan won his eighth scoring title, and Rodman his fifth straight rebounding title, while Kerr finished second in the league in three-point shooting percentage. Jordan garnered the elusive triple crown with the NBA MVP, NBA All-Star Game MVP, and NBA Finals MVP. Krause was named NBA Executive of the Year, Jackson Coach of the Year, and Kukoč the Sixth Man of the Year. Both Pippen and Jordan made the All-NBA First Team, and Jordan, Pippen, and Rodman made the All-Defensive First Team, making the Bulls one of several teams in NBA history with three players on the All-Defensive First Team.

In addition, the 1995–96 team holds several other records, including the best road record in a standard 41-road-game season (33–8), the all-time best start by a team (41–3), and the best start at home (37–0). The Bulls also posted the second-best home record in history (39–2), behind only the 1985–86 Celtics 40–1 home mark. The team triumphed over the Miami Heat in the first round, the New York Knicks in the second round, the Orlando Magic in the Eastern Conference Finals and finally Gary Payton, Shawn Kemp and the Seattle SuperSonics for their fourth title. The 1995–96 Chicago Bulls are widely regarded as one of the greatest teams in the history of basketball.

In the 1996–97 season, the Bulls missed out on a second consecutive 70-win season by losing their final two games to finish 69–13. They repeated their home dominance, going 39–2 at the United Center. The Bulls capped the season by defeating the Bullets, Hawks and Heat in the first three rounds of the playoffs en route to winning their fifth NBA championship over John Stockton, Karl Malone and the Utah Jazz. Jordan earned his second straight and ninth career scoring title, while Rodman earned his sixth straight rebounding title. Jordan and Pippen, along with Robert Parish, who was a member of the Bulls at the time, were also honored as members of the 50 greatest players of all time with the NBA celebrating its 50th season. Parish, whose single season with the Bulls would be his last year in the league, was nominated for his stellar career with the Boston Celtics.

The 1997–98 season was one of turmoil for the NBA champion Bulls. Many speculated this would be Michael Jordan's final season with the team. Phil Jackson's future with the team was also questionable, as his relationship with team general manager Jerry Krause was one of growing tension. Scottie Pippen was looking for a significant contract extension that he thought he deserved, but was not getting from the organization. In spite of the turmoil that surrounded the Bulls, they still had a remarkable season, with a final regular-season record of 62–20. Jordan would be named the league MVP for the fifth and final time, and the Bulls went into the playoffs as the number one seed in the Eastern Conference.

The first round of the playoffs for the Bulls was against the New Jersey Nets, a team led by Keith Van Horn, Kendall Gill and Sam Cassell. The Bulls swept the Nets three to nothing in a best of five series. The conference semi-finals were more challenging with the Charlotte Hornets stealing game two from the Bulls at the United Center, and tying the series 1–1. But the Bulls easily defeated the Hornets in the next three games of the series. The Conference Finals was a challenge for the Bulls as they went up against the Reggie Miller-led Indiana Pacers. Experts were of the opinion that the Pacers had the best chance to defeat the Bulls. The Pacers gave the Bulls no road wins, winning games 3, 4, and 6, sending the series to a deciding game seven at the United Center. The Bulls prevailed and beat the Pacers 88–83, winning their 6th Eastern Conference Championship.

In a much-anticipated Finals, The Bulls faced the team they beat the previous year, the Utah Jazz. Led by Karl Malone and John Stockton, the Jazz felt confident that they could defeat the Bulls, winning game one at Utah's Delta Center. Facing a potential two to nothing deficit, the Bulls won Game 2 at the Delta Center and tied the series. The Bulls returned to the United Center and, by winning the next two games, took a 3–1 series lead. The Jazz won Game 5 by two points, 83–81. Game 6 was a tough battle for both teams. Scottie Pippen left early in the 1st quarter due to an ongoing back injury. He came back at the start of the 2nd half, and after a trip or two to the locker room to get physical therapy, came back out to finish the game.  Late in the game and down by three points to the Jazz, Michael Jordan led the Bulls to one final win. Jordan hit a shot to bring the Bulls within 1, then stole the ball from Karl Malone and hit the game winning shot with 5.2 seconds remaining on the clock. With a score of 87–86, John Stockton put up a three-pointer, but missed, giving the Bulls their sixth championship in eight years. Jordan would be named the Finals MVP for the sixth time in his career. He retired for the second time on January 13, 1999.

1998–2008: Post-Jordan era and a decade of struggle

1998–2004: Post-dynasty struggles

The summer of 1998 brought an abrupt end to the championship era. Krause felt that the Bulls were on the verge of being too old and unable to compete. He decided that the team's only choices were to rebuild or endure a slow decline. His plan was to trade away the aging talent and acquire high draft picks while clearing salary cap space to make a run at several promising free agents in two years' time. After having been vetoed in a previous attempt by owner Jerry Reinsdorf, Krause traded Scottie Pippen for Roy Rogers (who was released in February 1999) and a conditional second-round draft pick from the Houston Rockets. He also decided not to re-sign Dennis Rodman, and traded Luc Longley and Steve Kerr for other draft picks. He hired a new coach, Tim Floyd, who had run a successful program at Iowa State University. Upon Phil Jackson's departure, Michael Jordan made his second retirement official. With a new starting lineup of point guard Randy Brown, shooting guard Ron Harper, newcomer Brent Barry at small forward, power forward Toni Kukoč, and center Bill Wennington, the team began the lockout-shortened 1998–99 season. Kukoč led the team in scoring, rebounding, and assists, but the team won only 13 of 50 games. The lowest point of the season came on April 10 in a game against the Miami Heat. In that game, the Bulls scored 49 points to set an NBA record for the fewest points in a game in the shot-clock era.

The previous year's dismal finish came with one highlight: the team won the draft lottery and the rights to power forward Elton Brand. Since the team lost Harper, Wennington and Barry in the off-season, Brand and fellow rookie Ron Artest led the team throughout the year, especially after Kukoč missed most of the season due to injury and was then dealt for a draft pick at the trading deadline. Brand recorded the first 20–10 average for the Bulls since the days of Artis Gilmore. He led all rookies in scoring, rebounds, blocks, field goal percentage and minutes, while Artest led all rookies in steals and finished second on the team in scoring. For his efforts Brand was named 1999–2000 co-Rookie of the Year with Houston's Steve Francis, and to the all-rookie first team, while Artest was named to the all-rookie second team. However, the team established a franchise low at 17–65, second-worst in the league.

After a summer in which the Bulls witnessed most major and minor free agents Tim Duncan, Grant Hill, Tracy McGrady, Eddie Jones and even Tim Thomas choose to stay with their teams (or go elsewhere) rather than sign with them, Krause signed free agent center Brad Miller and shooting guard Ron Mercer, and drafted power forward Marcus Fizer and traded draft pick Chris Mihm to Cleveland for the rights of guard Jamal Crawford. Brand again led the team in scoring and rebounds with another 20–10 season, but the new acquisitions failed to make a major impact, and they finished with the worst record in team history and the league's worst for the season at 15–67.

Krause shocked Bulls fans on draft day in 2001 when he traded franchise player Brand to the Los Angeles Clippers for the second pick in the draft, Tyson Chandler. He also selected Eddy Curry with the fourth pick. Since both Chandler and Curry came straight out of high school, neither was expected to make much of a contribution for several years, but they were seen as potential franchise players. The team floundered without veteran leadership. At mid-season, the Bulls traded their top three scorers—Mercer, Artest, and Miller along with Kevin Ollie—to the Indiana Pacers for veteran guard Jalen Rose, Travis Best and Norman Richardson. There was also a change in coaching, with Floyd being dismissed in favor of assistant coach and former Bulls co-captain Bill Cartwright, following a series of arguments with players and management. The Bulls improved from 15 to 21 wins, although they were still tied for last in the league.

For the 2002–03 season, the Bulls came to play with much optimism. They picked up college phenom Jay Williams with the second pick in the draft. Williams teamed with Jalen Rose, Crawford, Fizer, newcomer Donyell Marshall, Curry, Chandler, and guard Trenton Hassell to form a young and exciting nucleus which improved to 30–52 in Bill Cartwright's first full season as head coach. Curry led the league in field goal percentage, becoming the first Bull since Jordan to lead the league in a major statistical category.

During the summer of 2003, long-time GM Jerry Krause retired, and former player and color commentator John Paxson was tapped as his successor. Jay Williams, coming off a promising rookie campaign, was seriously injured in a motorcycle accident. His contract was bought out by the Bulls in February 2004, and he never returned to the league. Paxson selected point guard Kirk Hinrich with the seventh pick in the draft, and signed veteran free agent and former franchise player Scottie Pippen. With Pippen playing, Cartwright at the sidelines, and Paxson in the front office, the Bulls hoped that some of the championship magic from before would return.

However, the 2003–04 season was a resounding disappointment. Eddy Curry regressed, leading to questions about his conditioning and commitment. Tyson Chandler was plagued by a chronic back injury, missing more than thirty games. Pippen's ability to influence games was impaired by knee problems, and he openly contemplated retirement. Jamal Crawford remained inconsistent. Bill Cartwright was fired as head coach in December and replaced with former Phoenix coach Scott Skiles. A trade with the Toronto Raptors brought Antonio Davis and Jerome Williams in exchange for Rose and Marshall in what was seen as a major shift in team strategy from winning with athleticism to winning with hard work and defense. After struggling throughout the season, the Bulls finished with 23 wins and 59 losses, the second-worst record in the league. Fizer was not re-signed, and Crawford was re-signed and traded to the Knicks for expiring contracts. Hinrich provided the lone bright spot, becoming a fan favorite for his gritty determination and tenacious defense. He won a place on the All-Rookie first team.

2004–2007: Resurgence

During the 2004 off-season, Paxson traded a 2005 draft pick to the Phoenix Suns in return for an additional pick in the 2004 NBA draft. He used the picks to select Connecticut guard Ben Gordon and Duke small forward Luol Deng in the first round, and Duke point guard Chris Duhon in the second. Paxson also signed free agent small forward Andrés Nocioni, who had recently won an Olympic gold medal as a member of the Argentina national basketball team. After losing the first nine games of the season, the Bulls began to show signs of improvement behind their improved team defense and clutch fourth-quarter play from Gordon. The Bulls, who were 0–9 to start the season, finished the regular season 47–35, with the third-best record in the Eastern Conference and advanced to the NBA playoffs for the first time since Jordan's departure. In the first round, the 4th-seeded Bulls played the Washington Wizards. Despite an injury to Deng and a heart issue with Curry, the Bulls opened the series with two wins at home, but lost the next four games and the series. After the season, Ben Gordon became the first rookie to win the NBA Sixth Man Award and the first Bull since Kukoč in 1996 to win the award.

During the 2005 off-season, the Bulls re-signed free agent Tyson Chandler. However, Curry showed possible symptoms of a heart disease resulting of a heart murmur during checkups, and Paxson would not clear him to play without extensive DNA testing. Ultimately, Curry refused to participate in the tests, and he was traded along with Antonio Davis to the New York Knicks for Michael Sweetney, Tim Thomas, and what became the second pick of the 2006 NBA draft—as well as the right to swap picks with New York in the 2007 NBA draft.

Without a significant post presence, the Bulls struggled for most of the 2005–06 season. However, a late-season 12–2 surge allowed them to finish 41–41 and qualify for the 2006 playoffs as the seventh seed. There, the Bulls faced the Miami Heat. After two close losses in Miami, the Bulls broke through with a blowout win in Game 3, and another win in Game 4. However, the Heat took the next two games to win the series and went on to win that year's championship. The Bulls' several young players nevertheless earned additional postseason experience, and Nocioni turned in a remarkable series of performances that far exceeded his season averages.

In the 2006 NBA Draft, the Bulls were awarded forward-center LaMarcus Aldridge and immediately traded him to the Portland Trail Blazers for forward Tyrus Thomas and forward Viktor Khryapa. In a second draft-day trade, the Bulls selected Rodney Carney and traded him to the Philadelphia 76ers for guard Thabo Sefolosha. Later that summer, four-time Defensive Player of the Year Ben Wallace signed with the Bulls for a reported four-year, $60 million contract. Following the signing of Wallace, the Bulls traded Tyson Chandler, the last remaining player of the Krause era, to the (then) New Orleans/Oklahoma City Hornets for veteran power forward P.J. Brown and J. R. Smith and salary cap space that was used to sign former Chicago co-captain Adrian Griffin.

In 2006–07, the Bulls overcame a 3–9 season start to finish 49–33, the third-best record in the Eastern Conference. In the first round, the Bulls again faced Miami, the defending NBA champions. The Bulls narrowly won Game 1 at home, then followed it with a blowout victory in Game 2. In Miami, the Bulls rallied from a 12-point second-half deficit to win Game 3 and then posted another comeback win in Game 4. The Bulls' four-game sweep of the defending champions stunned many NBA observers. It was Chicago's first playoff series victory since 1998, Jordan's last season with the team.

The Bulls then advanced to face the Detroit Pistons, marking the first time the Central Division rivals had met in the playoffs since 1991. The Pistons won the first three games including a big comeback in Game 3. No NBA team had ever come back from a 0–3 deficit to win the series, but the Bulls avoided a sweep by winning Game 4 by 10 points. The Bulls then easily won Game 5 in Detroit, and had a chance to make NBA history. But they lost at home in game 6 by 10, and the Pistons won the series 4–2 on May 17.

2007–2008: Missing the playoffs

During the off season, the Bulls signed forward Joe Smith and guard Adrian Griffin, and drafted center Joakim Noah. However, distractions began when Luol Deng and Ben Gordon turned down contract extensions, never citing reasons. Then rumors surfaced that the Bulls were pursuing stars like Kevin Garnett, Pau Gasol, and most notably, Kobe Bryant. None of these deals happened, and general manager John Paxson denied a deal was ever imminent.

The Bulls started the 2007–08 season by losing 10 of their first 12 games and on December 24, 2007, after a 9–16 start, the Bulls fired head coach Scott Skiles. Jim Boylan was named the interim head coach on December 27, 2007.

On February 21, 2008, Ben Wallace, Joe Smith, Adrian Griffin and the Bulls' 2009 2nd-round draft pick were exchanged for Drew Gooden, Cedric Simmons, Larry Hughes and Shannon Brown in a three-team trade deal involving the Cleveland Cavaliers and the Seattle SuperSonics. Boylan was not retained on April 17 at the conclusion of the 2007–08 season after compiling a 24–32 record with the Bulls. The Bulls ended the 2007–08 campaign with a 33–49 record, a complete reversal of last year's record.

After Jim Boylan's interim tenure expired, the Bulls began the process of selecting a new head coach. They were in talks with former Phoenix head coach Mike D'Antoni, but on May 10, 2008, he signed with the New York Knicks. Other possible options included former Dallas head coach Avery Johnson and former Bulls head coach Doug Collins. Collins resigned from the coaching list on June 4, 2008, reporting that he did not want to ruin his friendship with Jerry Reinsdorf.

On June 10, 2008, the Bulls general manager John Paxson hired Vinny Del Negro, with no coaching experience, to coach the young Bulls. On July 3, 2008, the Chicago Tribune reported that Del Harris agreed to become an assistant coach for the Bulls along with former Charlotte Bobcats head coach Bernie Bickerstaff and longtime NBA assistant coach Bob Ociepka. Along with Bickerstaff and Ociepka, Harris helped establish a veteran presence on the coaching staff and helped rookie head coach Del Negro.

2008–2016: Derrick Rose era

2008–2010: Appearance of Derrick Rose
With a slim 1.7% chance of winning the rights to draft number 1, the Bulls won the 2008 NBA draft lottery and selected first overall. With this, the Bulls became the team with the lowest chance of winning to ever win the lottery since it was modified for the 1994 NBA draft, and second-lowest ever. On June 26, 2008, the Bulls drafted Chicago native Derrick Rose from the University of Memphis as the number 1 draft pick. At pick number 39 they selected Sonny Weems. The Bulls later traded Weems to the Denver Nuggets for Denver's 2009 regular second-round draft pick. The Bulls then acquired Ömer Aşık from the Portland Trail Blazers (selected with the 36th pick) for Denver's 2009 second-round draft pick, New York's 2009 second-round draft pick, and the Bulls' 2010 regular second-round draft pick. The Bulls re-signed Luol Deng to a six-year $71 million contract on July 30, 2008. He was later plagued with an injury keeping him from action for most of the 2008–09 season. Ben Gordon signed a one-year contract on October 2, 2008.

On February 18, 2009, the Bulls made their first of several trades, sending Andrés Nocioni, Drew Gooden, Cedric Simmons, and Michael Ruffin to the Sacramento Kings for Brad Miller and John Salmons. Then on February 19, 2009, the NBA trade deadline, the Bulls traded Larry Hughes to the New York Knicks for Tim Thomas, Jerome James, and Anthony Roberson. Later that day the Bulls made the third trade in a span of less than 24 hours by sending swingman Thabo Sefolosha to the Oklahoma City Thunder for a 2009 first-round pick. The trades brought a late-season push for the Bulls, which finally clinched a playoff berth on April 10, 2009, their fourth in the last five years. They finished the season with a 41–41 record. Their record was good enough to secure a No. 7 seed in the 2009 NBA playoffs, playing a tough series against the Boston Celtics. In Game 1, Derrick Rose scored 36 points, along with 11 assists, tying Kareem Abdul-Jabbar's record for most points scored by a rookie in a playoff debut. After breaking the record for most overtimes played in an NBA Playoffs Series, the Boston Celtics managed to overcome the Bulls after 7 games and 7 overtime periods played.

The Bulls had two first-round picks in the 2009 NBA draft and decided to take Wake Forest stand out forward James Johnson and athletic USC forward Taj Gibson. In the 2009 NBA off-season the Bulls lost their leading scorer, Ben Gordon, when he signed with their divisional rival, the Detroit Pistons.

On February 18, 2010, John Salmons was traded to the Milwaukee Bucks for Joe Alexander and Hakim Warrick. Meanwhile, Tyrus Thomas was traded to the Charlotte Bobcats for Acie Law, Flip Murray and a future protected first-round pick. On April 14, 2010, the Bulls clinched the playoffs with the number 8 seed. Unlike the previous year, however, the Bulls' playoff run was shorter and less dramatic as they were eliminated by the Cleveland Cavaliers in five games. On May 4, 2010, the Bulls officially fired head coach Vinny Del Negro.

2010–2011: Arrival of Tom Thibodeau

In early June 2010, Boston Celtics assistant Tom Thibodeau accepted a three-year contract to fill the Bulls' head coaching vacancy. He was officially introduced on June 23. On July 7, it was revealed that Carlos Boozer of the Utah Jazz had verbally agreed to an $80 million, five-year contract. Afterwards, the Bulls traded veteran point guard Kirk Hinrich to the Washington Wizards to create more cap space. The Bulls also signed former 76er and Jazz sharpshooter Kyle Korver to a three-year, $15 million contract. The same day that the Bulls signed Kyle Korver, they signed Turkish All-Star Ömer Aşık. After being matched by the Orlando Magic for J. J. Redick, they signed their third free agent from the Jazz in the off-season in shooting guard Ronnie Brewer, traded for former Warrior point guard C.J. Watson, and signed former Bucks power forward Kurt Thomas as well as former Spurs player Keith Bogans and former Celtic Brian Scalabrine.

Rose earned the 2011 NBA MVP Award, thereby becoming the youngest player in NBA history to win it. He became the first Bulls player since Michael Jordan to win the award. As a team, Chicago finished the regular season with a league-best 62–20 record and clinched the first seed in the Eastern Conference for the first time since 1998. The Bulls defeated the Indiana Pacers and the Atlanta Hawks in five and six games, respectively, thereby reaching the Eastern Conference finals for the first time since 1998, and faced the Miami Heat. After winning the first game of the series, they lost the next four games, ending their season.

2011–2014: Injury-plagued seasons for Derrick Rose

During the off-season, the Bulls drafted Jimmy Butler 30th overall in the 2011 NBA draft. After the NBA lockout ended, the Bulls lost Kurt Thomas to free agency, and released Keith Bogans. The Bulls signed veteran shooting guard Richard "Rip" Hamilton to a three-year deal, after he was waived by the Detroit Pistons. The Bulls also gave MVP Derrick Rose a 5-year contract extension worth $94.8 million.

Derrick Rose was voted as an NBA All-Star starter for the second consecutive year, and was the third leading voted player overall behind Dwight Howard and Kobe Bryant. Luol Deng was also selected as a reserve for the Eastern Conference. This was the first time that the Bulls had two all-stars since 1997, when Michael Jordan and Scottie Pippen were the duo. Derrick Rose was injured for most of the 2011–12 season; however, the team was still able to finish with a 50–16 record and clinched the first seed in the Eastern Conference for the second straight year and the best overall record in the NBA (tied with the San Antonio Spurs). Rose suffered a new injury when he tore his ACL during the 4th quarter of the first playoff game on April 28, 2012, against the Philadelphia 76ers and missed the rest of the series. Head coach Tom Thibodeau was criticized for keeping Rose in the game even though the Bulls were essentially minutes away from their victory over the 76ers. The Bulls lost the next three games, and also lost Noah to a foot injury after he severely rolled his ankle stepping on Andre Iguodala's foot in Game 3; he briefly returned for part of the fourth quarter of that game, but missed the following games in the series. After winning Game 5 at home, the Bulls were eliminated by the 76ers in Game 6 in Philadelphia, becoming the fifth team in NBA history to be eliminated as a first seed by an eighth seed. In Game 6, Andre Iguodala sank two free throws with 2.2 seconds left to put the 76ers up 79–78 after getting fouled by Ömer Aşık, who had missed two free throws five seconds earlier. At the end of the season, Boozer and Aşık were the only members on the Bulls' roster to have played in every game, with Korver and Brewer missing one game apiece. In the off-season, the Bulls gave up Lucas to the Toronto Raptors, Brewer to the New York Knicks, Korver to the Atlanta Hawks, Watson to the Brooklyn Nets and Aşık to the Houston Rockets, but brought back Kirk Hinrich. In addition, they added Marco Belinelli, Vladimir Radmanovic, Nazr Mohammed and Nate Robinson to the roster via free agency.

Rose missed the entire 2012–13 season, but despite his absence, the Bulls finished 45–37, second in the Central Division (behind the Indiana Pacers) and 5th in their conference. They defeated the Brooklyn Nets 4–3 (after leading 3–1) in the first round of the playoffs and lost to the Miami Heat 4–1 in the next round.

During the season, the Bulls snapped both Miami's 27-game winning streak and the New York Knicks' 13-game winning streak, becoming the second team in NBA history to snap two winning streaks of 13 games or more in a season.

Just 10 games into the 2013–14 season, Derrick Rose would tear his medial meniscus on a non-contact play. He declared he would miss the remainder of the season. On January 7, 2014, veteran forward Luol Deng was traded to the Cleveland Cavaliers for center Andrew Bynum and a set of picks. Bynum was immediately waived after the trade went through. The Bulls would finish second in the Central Division with 48 wins, and earned home-court advantage in the first round. Joakim Noah finished the season 4th in MVP voting, made All-NBA 1st team, and was awarded Defensive player of the year. However, due to lack of a strong offensive weapon,
they failed to win a single home game en route to losing to the Washington Wizards in five games.

In the 2014 NBA draft, the Bulls traded their 16th and 19th picks for Doug McDermott, the former Creighton star and 5th leading scorer in NCAA history, who was selected with the 11th pick, and in the second round, took Cameron Bairstow with the 49th pick. That off-season, they signed Pau Gasol, re-signed Kirk Hinrich and brought over Eurostar Nikola Mirotić, who was acquired via a draft-day trade in 2011, but could not come over sooner, due to salary cap constraints.

2014–2015: Return of Derrick Rose to health and rise of Jimmy Butler

The second return of Derrick Rose gave the Bulls and their fans optimism for the 2014–15 season. With 2-time NBA Champion Pau Gasol and a deep bench consisting of Taj Gibson, Nikola Mirotić, Tony Snell, Aaron Brooks, Doug McDermott, Kirk Hinrich, among others, the Bulls were one of the two favorite teams to come out of the Eastern Conference along with the Cleveland Cavaliers. The Bulls started off the season in style with a blowout win of the New York Knicks, and then winning 7 of their first 9 games (losses coming to the Cleveland Cavaliers and Boston Celtics). The emergence of Jimmy Butler as a primary scorer for the Bulls was a major surprise and he surged into the forefront of the "Most Improved Player of the Year" award race. Butler's statistical jump was noted by many as one of the greatest in NBA History, going from scoring just 13 points per game in 2013–14 to scoring 20 points per game in 2014–15. Pau Gasol was considered a huge asset for the Bulls and averaged a double-double throughout the season. Both Butler and Gasol ended up making the Eastern Conference All-Star team. The Bulls' second half of the season was marred by inconsistency and frustration set in with Derrick Rose blasting the team for not being on the same page. Tension between management and Tom Thibodeau continued to be a dark cloud hanging over the organization. The Bulls finished with a 50–32 record and the 3rd seed in the Eastern Conference. They faced the Milwaukee Bucks in the first round, and took advantage of the young and inexperienced Bucks by going up a quick 3–0 in the series. However, inconsistency and not being on the same page yet again plagued the Bulls as the Bucks won the next two games, sending a scare to Chicago. The Bulls bounced back with fury in Game 6 however, beating the Bucks by a playoff record 54 points winning the series 4–2. The next round saw the Bulls facing their arch-rival Cleveland Cavaliers, and their biggest nemesis, LeBron James, who had beaten the Bulls in all three of their previous playoff meetings. The Bulls shocked the Cavs in Game 1 dominating them and never trailing. The Cavs answered back in Game 2 in the same fashion, never trailing the entire game. In a pivotal Game 3 in Chicago, the Bulls and Cavs battled closely all the way through, but the Bulls prevailed on a last-second buzzer-beating 3-pointer by Derrick Rose. In Game 4, the Cavaliers would answer once again, with LeBron James hitting the buzzer-beating shot to win the game. The Bulls lack of consistency and poor offensive showing doomed them once again as the Cavaliers won the next two games handily and closed out the series 4–2. After the series, speculation erupted about Tom Thibodeau's job security due to escalating feud between Thibodeau and Bulls front office managers Gar Forman and John Paxson.

2015–2016: Change in approach

On May 28, 2015, the Bulls fired Tom Thibodeau to seek a "change in approach". The Bulls named Fred Hoiberg as their head coach on June 2, 2015. The Bulls had only 1 draft pick in the 2015 NBA draft, and selected center Bobby Portis from the University of Arkansas. Bulls forward Mike Dunleavy Jr. was ruled out for at least the first four months of the season after completing back surgery. With Dunleavy out indefinitely, the Bulls promoted Doug McDermott to the starting lineup in his place at small forward. Before the season started, coach Fred Hoiberg made an incredibly controversial move by putting Nikola Mirotić as his starting power forward to pair with center Pau Gasol, meaning Joakim Noah, a long-time Bulls veteran and a fan-favorite was to come off the bench. Hoiberg told the media that the move was suggested by Noah himself but Noah denied having made any suggestions to Hoiberg, which sparked a distrust between the two before the season even began.

The Bulls started the 2015–16 season off well with an impressive season-opening 97–95 victory against archrivals and defending Eastern Conference Champion Cleveland Cavaliers and jumped to an 8–3 record in the first month. The Bulls went 10–9 and through late November and December. The Bulls came back and won six straight games. However, soon afterwards, they lost 12 of their next 17 games and Butler missed four weeks after injuring his knee. The Bulls were eliminated from playoff contention after a loss to the Miami Heat on April 7, 2016, although finishing the season with a winning record of 42–40. It was the first time in 8 years that the Bulls had missed the playoffs.

2016–2017: Departure of Derrick Rose
On June 22, 2016, Derrick Rose and Justin Holiday, along with a 2017 second-round draft pick, were traded to the New York Knicks for center Robin Lopez, and point guards Jerian Grant and José Calderón, who was soon traded to the Los Angeles Lakers. On July 7, the Bulls announced the signing of Rose's replacement, guard Rajon Rondo. On July 15, the Bulls signed Chicago native Dwyane Wade. On October 17, 2016, the Bulls acquired 2014 Rookie of the Year Michael Carter-Williams in exchange for Tony Snell.
 
On February 23, 2017, Taj Gibson and Doug McDermott, along with a 2018 second-round draft pick, were traded to the Oklahoma City Thunder for point guard Cameron Payne, shooting guard Anthony Morrow, and power forward/center Joffrey Lauvergne. Jimmy Butler finished the season with several career highs, was named an All-Star, and made All-NBA 3rd team. The Bulls clinched the eighth seed in 2017 NBA playoffs after winning seven of their final ten games and finishing the season with a 41–41 record. The team struck an early 2–0 lead against the top-seeded Boston Celtics in the first round of the playoffs, but ultimately lost the series after losing the next four games.

2017–present: Post Derrick Rose/Zach Lavine Era

2017–2020: Final years of GarPax & Rebuilding 
On June 22, 2017, Jimmy Butler, along with Chicago's 2017 first-round pick, was traded to the Minnesota Timberwolves for Zach LaVine, Kris Dunn, and Minnesota's 2017 first-round pick, which the Bulls used to select Lauri Markkanen. Additionally, on June 27, the Bulls did not give a qualifying offer to Michael Carter-Williams, allowing him to enter unrestricted free agency. On June 30, Rajon Rondo and Isaiah Canaan were waived by the Bulls. On July 10, 2017, Justin Holiday returned to the Bulls signing a 2-year, $9 million contract. On September 24, 2017, Dwyane Wade and the Bulls reportedly agreed to a buyout of the remaining year on his contract. Adrian Wojnarowski reported that Wade gave back $8 million of his $23.2 million contract as part of the agreement.

On October 17, 2017, a fight broke out in practice between Bobby Portis and Nikola Mirotić, who suffered a concussion and two broken bones in his face. Portis was suspended eight games for his role in the altercation, and Mirotić missed 23 games to start the regular season. On February 1, 2018, the Bulls traded Mirotić and a second-round draft pick to the New Orleans Pelicans for a first-round draft pick and Ömer Aşık, Tony Allen, and Jameer Nelson. Bulls ended up finishing the season with 27–55 record.

On June 21, 2018, the Bulls selected Wendell Carter Jr. with the seventh overall pick, and with 22nd overall pick via trade with New Orleans Pelicans selected Chandler Hutchison. On July 8, the Bulls matched an offer Zach LaVine received from the Sacramento Kings for a four-year, $78 million deal. On July 14, the team signed Jabari Parker to a two-year, $40 million contract after the Milwaukee Bucks' general manager Jon Horst removed the qualifying offer on the restricted free agent and allowed him to become unrestricted. Part of Parker's agreement gave the Bulls a team option for the second year. On December 3, the Bulls fired head coach Hoiberg after the team started the 2018–19 season 5–19 and promoted his assistant Jim Boylen as head coach. On January 3, 2019, the Bulls traded Justin Holiday to the Memphis Grizzlies in exchange for MarShon Brooks, Wayne Selden Jr. and 2019 and 2020 second-round draft picks. MarShon Brooks and Cameron Payne were waived. On February 6, the team traded Bobby Portis, Jabari Parker and a 2023 second-round draft pick to the Washington Wizards an exchange for Otto Porter. After a season filled with injuries, coaching change, and trades, the Bulls finished with 22–60 record missing the playoffs for the second straight year.

On June 20, 2019, the Bulls selected Coby White with the seventh overall pick and Daniel Gafford with 38th pick in the second round. During the off-season, the team signed veterans Tomáš Satoranský and Thaddeus Young. In March 2020, the league suspended the season after Rudy Gobert tested positive for COVID-19. In April 2020, the Bulls fired longtime general manager Gar Forman, reassigned John Paxson to senior advisor role and hired Artūras Karnišovas as executive vice president of basketball operations. In May 2020, the Bulls hired Marc Eversley as general manager. On June 4, 2020, the Bulls season officially came to an end when the NBA Board of Governors approved a plan to bring 22 teams back to finish the season in the NBA Bubble. The Bulls finished with a 22–43 record.  Head Coach Jim Boylen was fired on August 14, 2020.

On September 22, 2020, the Bulls hired Billy Donovan as head coach. Donovan had previously coached the Oklahoma City Thunder.

On November 18, 2020, the Bulls selected Patrick Williams with the fourth overall pick.

On March 25, 2021, the Bulls traded Wendell Carter Jr, Otto Porter, along with 2021 and 2023 first-round draft picks to Orlando Magic for Nikola Vucevic and Al-Farouq Aminu. The team also traded Chandler Hutchison and Daniel Gafford to the Washington Wizards for Troy Brown Jr. and Moe Wagner. Wagner was later traded along with Luke Kornet to the Boston Celtics for Daniel Theis and Javonte Green.  The Bulls finished the abbreviated 72 game season with 31-41 record missing the playoffs for 4th consecutive year.

2021–present: Team transformation

On July 29,  2021, the Bulls selected hometown kid Ayo Dosunmu with 38th pick in the second round. On August 2, 2021, the Bulls sent Tomas Satoransky, Garrett Temple, 2024 second-round pick and cash to New Orleans Pelicans for Lonzo Ball. On the same day, the Bulls managed to sign free agent and 2020 NBA Champion Alex Caruso after he and the Los Angeles Lakers failed to reach an agreement. As part of the same preseason rebuild, on August 11, Chicago announced a trade sending Thaddeus Young, Al-Farouq Aminu, a protected first-round pick and second-round pick to the San Antonio Spurs in exchange for four-time All-Star DeMar DeRozan.

While playing against the Indiana Pacers on New Year's Eve in the 4th quarter, DeRozan hit a buzzer-beating game-winning shot to sink the Pacers 108-106. The next day on New Year's Day, While the Bulls were down 117-119, DeRozan hit another buzzer-beating shot to defeat the Washington Wizards 120-119, becoming the first player in NBA History to hit back-to-back game-winning buzzer-beater shots in consecutive days. The Bulls would then go on to win 9 games in a row. On January 22, 2022, it was announced that DeRozan would start in that year's All-Star Game. Eight days later, LaVine was named a reserve.

The Bulls finished 6th in the Eastern Conference, escaping the play in tournament .  The Bulls played the defending NBA Champion Milwaukee Bucks in the first round where they would lose in 5 games.  The Bulls three highest paid players Lavine-DeRozan-Vucevic all struggled in this series . On June 23, 2022, Bulls selected Dalen Terry with the 18 pick. On July 7, the Bulls re-signed Zach Lavine to a five-year $215.2 million dollar contract, making this largest contract signed in Bulls history.

On February 21, 2023, the Chicago Bulls signed Patrick Beverley with a 1 year $801,614 contract. After the signing Billy Donovan stated "You hope that a guy like him coming in gives a boost to our team. That's what he's always been.”  The addition excited the franchise's fans, with a new spark of hope for the play-in tournament. His addition aided the Bulls' win against the understaffed Nets, 131-87 on February 24th.

Rivalries

Cleveland Cavaliers

The Bulls–Cavaliers rivalry is a National Basketball Association (NBA) rivalry between the Cleveland Cavaliers and the Chicago Bulls.  The teams have played each other since the Cavaliers joined the NBA as an expansion team in 1970, but the rivalry didn't begin in earnest until the Bulls drafted Michael Jordan with the third overall pick in 1984. After Jordan would go on to the Washington Wizards and eventually retire, the rivalry died down, but when Cleveland picked LeBron James with the first selection in 2003, the rivalry heated up again. However, the Cavaliers had an edge on the Bulls, who would pick Derrick Rose with the first selection in 2008 to turn Chicago from a lottery team, to a future contender.

Detroit Pistons

The Bulls' main division rivals have been the Detroit Pistons ever since the Jordan-led Bulls met the "Bad Boy" Pistons in the 1988 Eastern Conference semifinals. The two teams met in the playoffs four consecutive years, with the Pistons winning each time until 1991. The Eastern Conference Finals in 1991 ended with a four-game sweep of the Pistons, who walked off the floor with time still on the game clock. The rivalry was renewed in the 2007 Eastern Conference Semifinals, in which former Detroit cornerstone Ben Wallace met his former team (the Pistons won in 6 games). The geographic proximity and membership in the Central Division further intensify the rivalry, which has been characterized by intense, physical play ever since the teams met in the late 1980s. Chicago fans' rivalry with Detroit extends past the NBA, as the two cities shared divisions in all four major North American sports until 2013 when the Detroit Red Wings moved to the Atlantic Division of the Eastern Conference.

Miami Heat
The Bulls and the Miami Heat rivalry began once the Heat became contenders during the 1990s, a decade dominated by the Bulls. They were eliminated 3 times by Chicago, who went on to win the title each time. The rivalry was revived due to the return of the Bulls to the playoffs in the post-Michael Jordan era and the emergence of Dwyane Wade and Derrick Rose. The revived rivalry was physical, involving rough plays and hard fouls between players, most notably the actions of former Heat player James Posey. The Bulls and Heat met in the 2011 Eastern Conference Finals, with the Heat winning in 5 games. On March 27, 2013, Chicago snapped Miami's 27-game winning streak. The Bulls and Heat met later that year in the 2013 Eastern Conference Semifinals. Miami won the series 4–1.

New York Knicks

Another franchise that the Bulls have competed fiercely with is the New York Knicks. The two teams met in the playoffs in four consecutive years (1991–1994) and again in 1996, with the teams' series twice (1992 and 1994) going the full seven games. Their first playoff confrontation, however, came in 1989 when both teams were called "teams on the rise" under Michael Jordan and Patrick Ewing, respectively (rivalry that started their freshman year in the 1982 NCAA Men's Division I Basketball Championship Game with Jordan hitting the deciding jumper of the final). That first confrontation would belong to Chicago with six games of the Eastern Semifinals. The Bulls won in the first three years (1991–1993) before losing in 1994 but got revenge in 1996. As with Detroit, the historic rivalry between the cities has led to animosity between the teams and occasionally their fans.

Traditions

Starting lineup introductions
During the Bulls' run of dominance, the player introductions became world-famous. Longtime announcer Tommy Edwards was the first to use "Sirius", "On The Run" and other songs in game presentation in the NBA. When Edwards moved to Boston for employment with CBS Radio, he was replaced by Ray Clay in 1990, and Clay continued many of the traditional aspects of the Bulls introductions, including the music, The Alan Parsons Project's "Sirius", for all six championship runs. The lights are first dimmed during the visiting team introduction, accompanied by "The Imperial March" from Star Wars composed by John Williams or "On the Run" by Pink Floyd, or "Tick of the Clock" by Chromatics. Virtually all lights in the stadium are then shut off for the Bulls introduction, and a spotlight illuminates each player as he is introduced and runs onto the court; the spotlight is also focused on the Bulls logo prior to the introductions. Since the move to the United Center, lasers and fireworks have been added, and with improvements to the arena's White Way video screen, computer graphics on the stadium monitors have been added. These graphics feature the 3D-animated 'Running of the Bulls' en route to the United Center, along the way smashing a bus featuring the opposing team's logo. Coincidentally, Alan Parsons wrote "Sirius" for his own band and was the sound engineer for "On the Run" from Pink Floyd's album The Dark Side of the Moon.

Traditionally, the players have been introduced in the following order: small forward, power forward, center, point guard, shooting guard. During the championship era, Scottie Pippen was usually the first (or second after Horace Grant) Bulls player introduced, and Michael Jordan the last. (Pippen and Jordan are the only players to play on all six Bulls championship teams.) More recently with Derrick Rose's arrival, the guards have been reversed in order, making the Chicago-bred point guard the last player introduced.  Although internal disputes eventually led to the dismissal of Clay, the Bulls in 2006 announced the return of Tommy Edwards as the announcer.

As part of Edwards' return, the introductions changed as a new introduction was developed by Lily and Lana Wachowski, Ethan Stoller and Jamie Poindexter, all from Chicago. The introduction also included a newly composed remix of the traditional Sirius theme.

Black shoes and socks
The Bulls have an unofficial tradition of wearing black shoes (regardless of being home or away) during the playoffs, which dates all the way back to 1989 when they debuted the tradition. Then-Bulls backup center Brad Sellers suggested to wear black shoes as a way to show unity within the team. For the 1996 playoffs, they became the first team to wear black socks with the black shoes, similar to the University of Michigan and the Fab Five which started the trend in college earlier in the decade. Since then, many teams have this look in both the regular season and playoffs. It was noted when the Bulls made their first playoff appearance during the 2004–05 season after a six-year hiatus, they continued the tradition and wore black shoes.

Even though the Bulls generally wear black footwear in the playoffs since 1989, there have been some notable exceptions. In the 1995 playoffs against the Magic, when Michael Jordan debuted his Air Jordan XI shoe, he wore the white colorway during the Bulls' playoff games in Orlando. He was fined by the Bulls for not complying with their colorway policy. During the 2009 playoffs, the Bulls again broke the tradition when all of their players wore white shoes and socks in Game 3 of the first round against the Boston Celtics. More recently, since the NBA's relaxation of sneaker color rules, some Bulls players wore either red or white sneakers in defiance of the tradition.

Circus trip
The Bulls and their arena mates, the Chicago Blackhawks, shared an odd tradition dating to the opening of Chicago Stadium. Every fall, Feld Entertainment's now-defunct Ringling Bros. and Barnum & Bailey Circus came to Chicago on its nationwide tour. Since it used large indoor venues rather than tents, it took over the United Center for its entire run and the Bulls were forced, along with the Blackhawks, to take an extended road trip that lasted about two weeks. Initially local newspapers and television and radio sportscasters, and later national programs like SportsCenter, referred to this fortnight-long local hiatus as "the circus trip". Blackhawks chairman Rocky Wirtz, who co-owns the United Center with Bulls chairman Jerry Reinsdorf, let the contract lapse after the circus' 2016 run, and condensed the formerly two-week local run of Feld's Disney on Ice to a week-long period effective February 2018. The circus itself would be discontinued in 2017.

Name, logo, and uniforms

Name
Dick Klein  wanted a name that evoked Chicago's traditional meat packing industry (similarly to the forerunner Packers franchise) and the Chicago Stadium's proximity to the Union Stock Yards. Klein considered names like Matadors or Toreadors, but dismissed them, saying, "If you think about it, no team with as many as three syllables in its nickname has ever had much success except for the [Montreal Canadiens]." After discussing possible names with his family, Klein settled on Bulls when his son Mark said, "Dad, that's a bunch of bull!"

Logo
The Bulls are unique in the fact they have used the same logo with very little change since the team's inception. The iconic logo is a red, charging bull's face. The logo was designed by noted American graphic designer Dean P. Wessel and was adopted in 1966. At one point, the Bulls also had an alternate logo during the early 1970s, featuring the same Bulls logo, but with a cloud that says "Windy City" below the bull's nose.

Uniforms

1966–1973 uniforms
The Bulls wear three different uniforms: a white uniform, a red uniform, and a black alternate uniform. The original uniforms were esthetically close to the current design, featuring the iconic diamond surrounding the Bulls logo on the shorts and block lettering. What distinguished the original uniforms were the black drop shadows, red or white side stripes with black borders, and white lettering on the red uniforms. For the 1969–70 season, the red uniforms were tweaked to include the city name.

1973–1985 uniforms
For the 1973–74 season, the Bulls drastically changed their look, removing the side stripes and drop shadows while moving the front numbers to the left chest. While the white uniforms saw the "Bulls" wordmark go from a vertically arched to radially arched arrangement, the red uniforms saw a more significant makeover, featuring black lettering and a script "Chicago" wordmark. With a few tweaks in the lettering, these uniforms were used until 1985.

This uniform set was later revived as a throwback uniform during the 2003–04 and 2015–16 seasons.

1985–present uniforms
Starting with the 1985–86 season, the Bulls updated their uniform. Among the more notable changes in the look were centered uniform numbers and a vertically arched "Bulls" wordmark in both the red and white uniforms. Like the previous set, this uniform saw a few tweaks particularly in the treatment of the player's name.

When Nike became the NBA's uniform provider in 2017, the Bulls kept much of the same look save for the truncated shoulder striping and the addition of the Chicago four stars on the waistline. With Nike and the NBA eliminating designations on home and away uniforms, the Bulls also announced that their red "Icon" uniforms would become their home uniforms, and the white "Association" uniforms would become their away uniforms. The Bulls would continue to wear red "Icon" uniforms in home games until the 2020–21 season, after which they returned to wearing the white "Association" uniforms in home games starting in the 2021–22 season.

Alternate black uniforms
In the 1995–96 season, the Bulls added a black uniform to their set. The initial look featured red pinstripes and lacked the classic diamond on the shorts. This set was revived as throwback uniforms in the 2012–13 seasons.

From the 1997–98 to the 2005–06 seasons, the Bulls wore slightly modified black uniforms without pinstripes. This set, with a few slight changes in the template, also marked the return of the city name in front of the uniform during the 1999–2000 season.

The 2006–07 season saw another change in the Bulls' black alternate uniform, now resembling the red and white uniform with the addition of a red diamond in the shorts. For the 2014–15 season, the uniforms were tweaked a bit to include sleeves and a modernized diamond treatment in black with red and white borders.

Since the 2017–18 season, the Bulls' black uniforms remained mostly untouched save for the aforementioned switch to the new Nike logo that affected the treatment towards the shoulder piping. Nike also dubbed this uniform as the "Statement" uniform in reference to its third jerseys. The Bulls began wearing the Statement uniforms after Thanksgiving and they are currently used in away games against teams that wear their white, gray/silver or cream uniforms.

The 2019–20 season marked the return of pinstripes to the Bulls' "Statement" uniform, albeit in dark gray. In addition, the diamond treatment returned to red, piping was tweaked, and four six-point stars were featured on the beltline. The Bulls wore this "Statement" uniform in select home games and away games against teams wearing white, cream or silver uniforms.

Other uniforms
During the 2005–06 season, the Bulls honored the defunct Chicago Stags by wearing the team's red and blue throwback uniforms. The set featured red tops and blue shorts.

From 2006 to 2017, the Bulls wore a green version of their red uniforms during the week of St. Patrick's Day in March. The only red elements visible were those found on the team logo. For 2015 the Bulls wore sleeved versions of the green uniform that featured white lettering with gold and black trim and the "Chicago" wordmark replacing "Bulls" in front. In 2016 and 2017, they wore the same uniforms minus the sleeves.

Between 2009 and 2017, the Bulls wore a variation of their red uniforms as part of the NBA's "Noche Latina" festivities every March. The only notable change in this uniform was the "Los Bulls" wordmark in front. For 2014, the Bulls briefly retired the look in favor of a black sleeved uniform featuring "Los Bulls" in white with red trim.

During the NBA's "Green Week" celebrations, the Bulls also wore green uniforms, but with a slightly darker shade from their St. Patrick's Day counterparts. They used their black alternate uniforms as its template. They donned the uniforms in a game against the Philadelphia 76ers on April 9, 2009.

The Bulls also wore special edition Christmas uniforms as part of the NBA's Christmas Day games. The one-off Christmas uniforms were as follows:
 2012: Monochrome red uniforms with lettering in red with black trim.
 2013: Sleeved red uniforms with Bulls logo rendered in silver.
 2014: Modified version of red uniform featuring the Bulls logo in front and a contrasting white nameplate of the player's first name. 
 2015: Red uniforms with ornate script letters in cream.
 2016: Monochrome red uniforms with ornate script letters in black.

From 2015 to 2017, the Bulls wore a gray "Pride" sleeved uniform, featuring the team name and other lettering in red with white trim. The shorts featured a more modernized version of the diamond, along with four six-pointed stars on either side.

In the 2017–18 season, the Bulls wore special "City" uniforms designed by Nike. The uniforms, designed to pay homage to Chicago's flag, are in white and feature the classic "Chicago" script and numbers in red with light blue trim along with four six-pointed stars on each side.

The Bulls' 2018–19 "City" uniform is once again inspired from Chicago's flag, with a black base and a portion of the flag with four red six-point stars and two powder blue stripes in front.

The Bulls' "City" uniform for 2019–20 continued the flag theme, featuring a light blue base and a recolored Bulls logo in front. The predominantly blue uniform was also inspired from the waters of Lake Michigan and the Chicago River.

For the 2020–21 season, the Bulls' "City" uniform featured elements of Chicago's Art Deco architecture and imagery, featuring a dark grey base, gold lettering and red accents.

The Bulls' "City" uniform for the 2021–22 season was a "mixtape" of past uniform designs. The predominantly red uniform featured the following design cues:
 Black and white striping, monochrome Bulls logo and white numbers with black drop shadows (1966–73 uniforms)
 Cursive "Chicago" script, recolored to match the numbers (1973–85 uniforms)
 Black diamonds with red pinstripes (1995–97 alternate uniforms)

The 2022–23 "City" uniform paid homage to Chicago's municipal device "Y" symbol. The predominantly white uniform featured rust red letters and black trim, as well as alternating red and black side stripes.

Mascots

Benny the Bull is the main mascot of the Chicago Bulls. He was first introduced in 1969. Benny is a red bull who wears number 1. Benny is one of the oldest and best-known mascots in all of professional sports. The Bulls also had another mascot named Da Bull. Introduced in 1995, he was described on the team website as being the high-flying cousin of Benny, known for his dunking skills. The man who portrayed Da Bull was arrested in 2004 for possession and selling marijuana from his car. Da Bull was retired soon after the incident. While Benny has a family-friendly design, Da Bull was designed as a more realistic bull. Unlike Benny, Da Bull was brown. He also had a meaner facial expression and wore number 95.

Season-by-season record
List of the last five seasons completed by the Bulls. For the full season-by-season history, see List of Chicago Bulls seasons.

Note: GP = Games played, W = Wins, L = Losses, W–L% = Winning percentage

Franchise records

Training facilities
Alumni Hall on DePaul University's Lincoln Park campus was the practice facility for the Bulls in the 1960s and 1970s.

In 1992, the team began training at the Berto Center, located in Deerfield, Illinois.

On June 13, 2012, the team announced that it would move its practice facility to a downtown location closer to the United Center to reduce game day commutes. On September 12, 2014, the Bulls officially opened their new training facility, the Advocate Center (named after the Advocate Medical Group, one of the medicine-practicing firms that serves Chicago), a block east of the United Center.

Home arenas

Players

Current roster

Retained draft rights
The Bulls hold the draft rights to the following unsigned draft picks who have been playing outside the NBA. A drafted player, either an international draftee or a college draftee who is not signed by the team that drafted him, is allowed to sign with any non-NBA teams. In this case, the team retains the player's draft rights in the NBA until one year after the player's contract with the non-NBA team ends. This list includes draft rights that were acquired from trades with other teams.

Franchise leaders
Bold denotes still active with the team. Italics denotes still active, but not with the team.

Points scored (regular season) (as of the end of the 2021–22 season)

 1. Michael Jordan (29,277)
 2. Scottie Pippen (15,123)
 3. Bob Love (12,623)
 4. Luol Deng (10,286)
 5. Jerry Sloan (10,233)
 6. Chet Walker (9,788)
 7. Artis Gilmore (9,288)
 8. Kirk Hinrich (8,536)
 9. Reggie Theus (8,279)
 10. Derrick Rose (8,001)
 11. Ben Gordon (7,372)
 12. Horace Grant (6,866)
 13. Zach LaVine (6,649)
 14. Norm Van Lier (6,505)
 15. Jimmy Butler (6,208)
 16. Toni Kukoč (6,148)
 17. Orlando Woolridge (6,146)
 18. Dave Greenwood (5,824)
 19. B. J. Armstrong (5,553)
 20. Mickey Johnson (5,531)
 21. Dave Corzine (5,457)
 22. Joakim Noah (5,325)
 23. Taj Gibson (5,280)
 24. John Paxson (4,932)
 25. Bob Boozer (4,807)
 26. Tom Boerwinkle (4,596)
 27. Quintin Dailey (4,473)
 28. Bob Weiss (4,445)
 29. Carlos Boozer (4,347)
 30. Andres Nocioni (4,120)
 31. Clem Haskins (3,703)
 32. Bill Cartwright (3,638)
 33. Wilbur Holland (3,568)
 34. Lauri Markkanen (3,439)
 35. Eddy Curry (3,414)
 36. Charles Oakley (3,162)
 37. Elton Brand (3,117)
 38. Steve Kerr (3,109)
 39. Ricky Sobers (3,059)
 40. Scott May (3,048)
 41. Nikola Mirotic (2,774)
 42. Ron Harper (2,760)
 43. Jalen Rose (2,742)
 44. Jamal Crawford (2,737)
 45. Jim Washington (2,736)
 46. Coby White (2,672)
 47. Pau Gasol (2,633)
 48. Marcus Fizer (2,426)
 49. Tyson Chandler (2,397)
 50. John Mengelt (2,386)

Other statistics (regular season) (as of the end of the 2021–22 season)

Head coaches

Hall of Famers, retired, and honored numbers

Basketball Hall of Famers

Notes:
 1 In total, Jordan was inducted into the Hall of Fame twice – as player and as a member of the 1992 Olympic team.
 2 In total, Pippen was inducted into the Hall of Fame twice – as player and as a member of the 1992 Olympic team.
 3 He also played for the team in 1966–1976.
 4 Colangelo worked as a marketing director, scout, and assistant to the president of the team.
 5 Also served as assistant coach in 1987–1989.
 6 He also coached the team in 1981–1982.

FIBA Hall of Famers

Notes:
 1 In total, Jordan was inducted into the FIBA Hall of Fame twice – as player and as a member of the 1992 Olympic team.

Chicagoland Sports Hall of Fame

Retired numbers and honorees

 The NBA retired Bill Russell's No. 6 for all its member teams on August 11, 2022.

Media

Radio
The team's games are broadcast on Entercom's WSCR (670) as of February 3, 2018. From October 2015-January 2018, games were carried on Cumulus Media's WLS (890) in a deal that was expected to last until the 2020–21 season, but was nullified in the middle of the 2017–18 season after Cumulus filed for Chapter 11 bankruptcy and nullified several large play-by-play and talent contracts.

Chuck Swirsky does play-by-play, with Bill Wennington providing color commentary. Univision Radio's WRTO (1200) has carried Spanish language game coverage since 2009–10, with Omar Ramos as play-by-play announcer and Matt Moreno as color analyst.

Television
The Bulls' television broadcasts are televised by NBC Sports Chicago, which broadcasts all of the games that are not televised nationally as of the 2019–20 season. For many years, broadcasts were split between NBC Sports Chicago (and prior to that, FSN Chicago), WGN-TV, and WCIU-TV. The announcers are Adam Amin and Stacey King. Jason Benetti fills in for Amin whenever the latter is assigned to work for Fox Sports.

On January 2, 2019, the Bulls (along with the Chicago White Sox and Chicago Blackhawks) agreed to an exclusive multi-year deal with NBC Sports Chicago, ending the team's broadcasts on WGN-TV following the 2018–19 season.

References

External links

 

 
National Basketball Association teams
Bulls
Basketball teams established in 1966
1966 establishments in Illinois